The striped bandicoot (Microperoryctes longicauda) is a species of marsupial in the family Peramelidae. It is found in West Papua and Papua New Guinea. Its natural habitat is subtropical or tropical dry forests. The Striped bandicoot is a host of the Acanthocephalan intestinal parasite Australiformis semoni.

References

Peramelemorphs
Marsupials of New Guinea
Mammals of Papua New Guinea
Mammals of Western New Guinea
Least concern biota of Oceania
Mammals described in 1876
Taxa named by Wilhelm Peters
Taxonomy articles created by Polbot